In particle physics the little hierarchy problem in the Minimal Supersymmetric Standard Model (MSSM) is a refinement of the hierarchy problem. According to quantum field theory, the mass of the Higgs boson must be rather light for the electroweak theory to work. However, the loop corrections to the mass are naturally much greater; this is known as the hierarchy problem. New physical effects such as supersymmetry may in principle reduce the size of the loop corrections, making the theory natural. However, it is known from experiments that new physics such as superpartners does not occur at very low energy scales, so even if these new particles reduce the loop corrections, they do not reduce them enough to make the renormalized Higgs mass completely natural. The expected value of the Higgs mass is about 10 percent of the size of the loop corrections which shows that a certain "little" amount of fine-tuning seems necessary.

Particle physicists have different opinions as to whether the little hierarchy problem is serious.

See also
MSSM Higgs mass
Naturalness
mu problem

References

Supersymmetric quantum field theory